Bernabé Barragán Maestre (born 18 February 1993), known as Bernabé Barragán simply as Bernabé, is a Spanish footballer who plays as a goalkeeper for Albacete Balompié.

Club career
Born in Los Palacios y Villafranca, Seville, Andalusia, Bernabé was a Real Betis youth graduate. On 5 November 2011, due to the injuries of Adrián and Antonio Ayala, he made his senior debut with the reserves by starting in a 0–3 Segunda División B away loss against Sporting Villanueva Promesas.

In July 2013 Bernabé moved to another reserve team, Atlético Madrid B also in the third division. Mainly a backup to Bono and David Gil, he only became a starter during the 2015–16 campaign, with his side now in Tercera División.

On 5 July 2017, Bernabé left Atleti, despite training regularly with the main squad since October 2014. On 20 July, he signed a three-year contract with Segunda División side Gimnàstic de Tarragona, mainly as a replacement to departing Manolo Reina.

On 7 October 2017 Bernabé made his professional debut by starting, committing a penalty and being replaced by José Perales after being injured in a 0–2 away loss against CD Tenerife. Midway through the 2018–19 season, he became the club's first choice under manager Enrique Martín, overtaking new signing Isaac Becerra.

On 1 June 2020, Bernabé terminated his contract with Nàstic, and signed a two-year deal with Albacete Balompié in the second division on 15 August.

References

External links

Beticopedia profile 

1993 births
Living people
People from Los Palacios y Villafranca
Sportspeople from the Province of Seville
Spanish footballers
Footballers from Andalusia
Association football goalkeepers
Segunda División players
Segunda División B players
Tercera División players
Betis Deportivo Balompié footballers
Atlético Madrid B players
Gimnàstic de Tarragona footballers
Albacete Balompié players